Jock Terence Cumberford was an Australian association football player.

Playing career

International career
Cumberford played three matches for Australia, all in 1922. He played in Australia's first three full international matches, all against New Zealand.

Coaching career
During the mid-1940s Cumberford coached in the Queensland State League.

References

External links

See also
Dave Cumberford

Year of birth missing
Year of death missing
Australian soccer players
Australia international soccer players
Association football forwards